Christopher P. Marquis is a bioprocess engineer and academic at the University of New South Wales (UNSW), Sydney, Australia. His research covers the development of biotechnology products through the lens of a bioprocess engineer, focusing on Recombinant protein production and other bioproducts, including nucleic acids and bacteriophage. He is the academic director of the UNSW Recombinant Products Facility (RPF). He is the co-author of over 75 refereed journal articles. He also actively engages with industry.

Career 
Marquis received his doctorate in Biochemical Engineering from the University of Sydney in 1994. He has a BSc (Chemistry) and a BE(Hons) in Biochemical Engineering from the University of Sydney. Since 1994, he has held an academic positions at the University of NSW in the School of Biotechnology and Biomolecular Sciences. In 2002, he completed a Graduate Diploma in Technology Management from Deakin University.

Research 
Marquis's current academic research focuses on: 

 Generation and characterisation of recombinant spider silk proteins
 Bioprocessing optimisation for cytokine production
 Photobioreactor studies on engineered cyanobacteria
 Plasmid production for gene therapy and in vitro mRNA synthesis
 Processing of therapeutic bacteriophage

Marquis has also recently had successful collaborations in other disciplines, including those in the areas of:

 Production and purification recombinant reductive dehalogenases
 Nanobiotechnology; the interface of nanoparticles with biological systems

Teaching 
Marquis is the academic convenor of the Biotechnology undergraduate program at UNSW. He teaches bioprocessing and in areas of biotechnology commercialisation.

External links 

 University of New South Wales Recombinant Products Facility
 Christopher P Marquis Google Scholar Citations
 Christopher P Marquis University of New South Wales

Living people
Year of birth missing (living people)
Academic staff of the University of New South Wales
University of Sydney alumni